Tatian the Assyrian, Christian writer and theologian of the 2nd century
 Tatian or Tatianus the Deacon, companion of Saint Hilarius of Aquileia, d c 284
 Antonius Tatianus, Roman politician of the 4th century
 Eutolmius Tatianus, Roman consul in 391.
 Tatianus (consul 466), Roman consul in 466.